Raymond ou Le Secret de la reine, is an Opéra-Comique in three acts on a libretto by Joseph-Bernard Rosier and Adolphe de Leuven, librettists of A Midsummer Night's Dream, by Ambroise Thomas, inspired by Shakespeare and premiered on 5 June 1851 at the Théâtre des Nouveaux. 

The opera revisits the myth of the iron mask. Raymond, a young peasant in love with an orphan (Stelle), is recognized as the twin brother of Louis XIV and persecuted so as not to hinder his reign. At the end of the three acts, the hero and his beloved manage to flee thanks to the sacrifice of the Chevalier de Rosargues: brutal soldier, father of Stelle whose mother he raped and killed. He replaces Raymond behind his iron mask hoping for redemption. 

If the work seems to have had a certain public success, it is difficult to assess today as the press of the time shows hostility to Raymond, considered unworthy of an academician.

References

External links

1851 operas
French-language operas
Operas
Operas by Ambroise Thomas